Now We're in the Air is a 1927 American silent comedy film directed by Frank R. Strayer, starring the late-1920s intermittent comedy team of Wallace Beery and Raymond Hatton. In a supporting role, Louise Brooks plays twins, one raised French and the other raised German. 
 
Wallace Beery and Louise Brooks worked together the following year in the taut drama Beggars of Life, a well-received early sound film.  Hatton also sometimes appeared paired in films with Beery's older brother Noah Beery.

Plot
Wally (Wallace Beery) and Ray (Raymond Hatton) are cousins whose grandfather, Lord Abercrombie McTavish (Russell Simpson), is an aviation enthusiast who wanted to sign up as a pilot in the war. Wally and Ray are intent upon getting the fortune of their Scottish grandfather, and decide to show him that they are just as interested in aviation.

Wally and Ray enlist in the United States Army Air Service, and are caught up in the aerial battles over the World War I front lines. When the duo flies over the enemy lines in a runaway balloon, through a misunderstanding, they are honored as heroes of the enemy forces.

The Germans send the aviators back to the U. S. lines as spies for the Kaiser. Here they are captured and almost shot, but everything ends happily. Along the way, Wally and Ray fall in love with twin sisters, Grisette and Griselle (both played by Louise Brooks, one loyal to the French, the other to the Germans).

Cast

 Wallace Beery as Wally
 Raymond Hatton as Ray
 Russell Simpson as Lord Abercrombie McTavish
 Louise Brooks as Griselle and as Grisette
 Emile Chautard as Monsieur Chelaine
 Malcolm Waite as Prof. Saenger
 Duke Martin as Top Sargeant
 Richard Alexander as German officer (uncredited)
 Theodore von Eltz as German officer (uncredited)
 Fred Kohler (uncredited)
 Charles Stevens as Knife Thrower (uncredited)
 Mattie Witting as Madame Chelaine, mother of the twins (uncredited)

Production

With the working title of We're Up in the Air Now , Now We're in the Air was the third in a series of war comedies starring Wallace Beery and Raymond Hatton. It followed on the heels of the popular Behind the Front and We're in the Navy Now (both released in 1926).

Most of the footage in Now We're in the Air features Beery and Hatton creating mayhem around a World War I airfield. Along with original aerial scenes, the aerial battle footage was left over from Wings (1927) and intercut into the action. Frank Tomick was hired as the stunt pilot to create additional scenes. He operated out of Griffith Park air field where Paramount had leased the airfield and the National Guard Curtiss JN-4 "Jennies" stationed there.

Reception
Now We're in the Air was popular in its time, although not as well received as the earlier military farces from the Beery/Hatton team. The aerial scenes were an interesting aspect of the production. In a modern re-appraisal, however, reviewer Janiss Garza commented: "In spite of a dual role, Brooks doesn't have much to do; Moving Picture World felt that 'any intelligent extra girl' could have handled the part."Allmovie.com

Preservation: 23 Minutes

Now We're in the Air was long believed to be a lost film. Three fragments were discovered in 2016 in a Czech archive: most of the surviving material was incomplete and badly deteriorated but approximately 23 minutes of the original 6 reel film was able to be preserved to the point of crystalline clarity, including a lengthy sequence in which Louise Brooks wears a black tutu. The print was found in Prague at the Czech Národní filmový archiv (the Czech Republic’s National Film Archive) by film preservationist Robert Byrne.

"When Byrne inspected the elements for Rif a Raf, Politi (the Czech title for Now We’re in the Air), he found the film had only partially survived in a state which also showed nitrate decomposition. Additionally, the surviving scenes were found to be out of order, and there were Czech-language titles in place of the original American titles. Byrne spent more than eight months reconstructing the surviving material, including restoring the film’s original English-language intertitles and original tinting."

The preserved print of Now We're in the Air was shown for the first time at the San Francisco Silent Film Festival on June 2, 2017.

See also
List of incomplete or partially lost films

References

Notes

Citations

Bibliography

 Brooks, Louise. Lulu in Hollywood. New York: Knopf, 1982. .
 Farmer, James H. Celluloid Wings: The Impact of Movies on Aviation. Blue Ridge Summit, Pennsylvania: Tab Books Inc., 1984. .
 Gladysz, Thomas. Now We're in the Air. New York: PandorasBox Press, 2017. .
 Paris, Barry. Louise Brooks. New York: Knopf, 1989. .
 Paris, Michael. From the Wright Brothers to Top gun: Aviation, Nationalism, and Popular Cinema. Manchester, UK: Manchester University Press, 1995. .
 Pendo, Stephen. Aviation in the Cinema. Lanham, Maryland: Scarecrow Press, 1985. .
 Wynne, H. Hugh. The Motion Picture Stunt Pilots and Hollywood's Classic Aviation Movies. Missoula, Montana: Pictorial Histories Publishing Co., 1987. .

External links

"Long Missing Louise Brooks Film Found"; Huffington Post
Fan tribute & forum
Now We're in the Air (restored version) at vimeo.com

1927 films
1927 comedy films
American silent feature films
American black-and-white films
Films directed by Frank R. Strayer
Paramount Pictures films
Silent American comedy films
American aviation films
American World War I films
1920s American films